Albulichthys albuloides is a cyprinid fish found in Southeast Asia. It is the only member of its genus, although the population on the mainland and the population on the islands of the Malay Archipelago may be different species.

References
Citations

Bibliography

Cyprinid fish of Asia
Fauna of Southeast Asia
Fish described in 1855